Nader Sufyan Abbas (born Andrey Ivanov on 12 December 1975) is a Qatari weightlifter who competed in the Men's  weight class at the 2004 Summer Olympics and finished 9th. He is the 2001 world champion.

One of eight Bulgarian weightlifters recruited by the Qatar Olympic Committee for $1,000,000, Abbas became a Qatari citizen to represent the country in the 2000 Olympics. His old name, Andrei Ivanov, was left behind in the process. Qatar has been known for recruiting sportspeople from other countries, the most notable examples being fellow weightlifter Said Saif Asaad (formerly Angel Popov of Bulgaria) and world-class runner Saif Saaeed Shaheen.

During the 2000 Summer Olympics, he dropped out shortly before the competition, citing a virus infection.

References

External links
Athens 2004 participant bio

Weightlifters at the 2000 Summer Olympics
Weightlifters at the 2004 Summer Olympics
Bulgarian emigrants to Qatar
Qatari male weightlifters
Bulgarian male weightlifters
1975 births
Living people
Naturalised citizens of Qatar
Weightlifters at the 2002 Asian Games
Weightlifters at the 2006 Asian Games
World Weightlifting Championships medalists
Asian Games competitors for Qatar
Olympic weightlifters of Qatar